Ludgeřovice (1939–45: Ludgerstal) is a municipality and village in Opava District in the Moravian-Silesian Region of the Czech Republic. It has about 4,900 inhabitants and it is one of the most populated Czech municipalities without the town status. It is part of the historic Hlučín Region.

History
The first written mention of Ludgeřovice is from 1303.

Notable people
Vladimír Coufal (born 1992), footballer

Twin towns – sister cities

Ludgeřovice is twinned with:
 Putnok, Hungary
 Tisovec, Slovakia

References

External links

Villages in Opava District
Hlučín Region